Cangonj is a village in the Progër administrative unit in the Devoll Municipality of Albania. The population is about 372 inhabitants, most of which deal in subsistence farming or agricultural-related work.

The Trans Adriatic Pipeline (under construction) passes through Cangonj. The construction project has contributed to the infrastructure of the area, such as the funding for the repaving of the road that goes through Cangonj.

References

Populated places in Devoll (municipality)
Villages in Korçë County